German name of Bóbr river
Bober (surname)
Johann von Böber (1746-1820), German teacher, entomologist and botanist

See also